The 2008 WNBA season was the 12th for the Phoenix Mercury. The Mercury were not able to win their second consecutive WNBA Championship and became the first defending champion to not qualify for the playoffs.

Offseason
On September 27, 2007, head coach Paul Westhead resigned and took a job as an assistant coach under P.J. Carlesimo for the Seattle SuperSonics. Assistant coach Corey Gaines was named the team's new head coach on November 7 of that year.

Expansion Draft
 Jennifer Lacy was selected in the 2008 Expansion Draft for the Atlanta Dream.

WNBA Draft

Transactions

Trades

Free agents

Regular season

Season standings

Season schedule

Player stats

Regular season

Phoenix Mercury Regular Season Stats

Roster

Awards and honors
 Diana Taurasi, WNBA Player of the Week (June 2–8, June 16–22, June 23–29, and September 1–7)
 Cappie Pondexter, WNBA Player of the Week (July 14–20)
 Diana Taurasi, WNBA Peak Performers (Points)
 Diana Taurasi, All-WNBA First Team

References

Phoenix Mercury seasons
Phoenix
Phoenix Mercury